Iroquois County is a county located in the northeast part of the U.S. state of Illinois. According to the 2020 United States Census, it has a population of 27,077.
It is the only county in the United States to be named Iroquois, after the American Indian people. The county seat is Watseka. The county is located along the border with Indiana.

History
Iroquois County was created on February 26, 1833, out of a portion of Vermilion County. It was named for the Iroquois River, which was itself named for the Iroquois people.  The first county seat was established at the town of Iroquois in 1837, though no official buildings were constructed there and offices were rented.  Several other sites for the county seat were examined, and in 1839 it was moved to Middleport; a court house and jail were built there.  There was a long battle between Middleport and Watseka (also known as South Middleport) as to which should be the county seat; in 1865, it was finally moved to Watseka.  The town of Middleport no longer exists, but there is a township of that name.  A courthouse was built in Watseka in 1866 at a cost of $28,000 and included a jail in the basement; this building was expanded in 1881, and a new jail was built in 1893 just east of the courthouse.

Geography
It is the third-largest county in Illinois by land area and the fifth-largest by total area.

The county is bordered on the east by the state of Indiana and its counties of Benton and Newton. To the north lies Kankakee County. Vermilion County, out of which Iroquois County was originally formed, lies to the south. To the west is Ford County.

The Iroquois River enters the county from Indiana and flows westward along the south side of the village of Iroquois, then along the north side of the city of Watseka, whereupon it veers to the north and joins the larger Kankakee River near the city of Kankakee in the county of the same name; the Kankakee River then flows into the Illinois River further to the northwest in Will County.  Sugar Creek, further to the south, also flows from the east to the west, entering from Indiana east of Stockland; it passes through the south edge of Milford, is joined by Mud Creek coming up from the south, and winds to the north past the village of Woodland and meets the Iroquois River near Watseka.

The Iroquois County State Wildlife Area, a  state park, is located in the northeast corner of the county.  There are also three nature preserves:  Bonnie's Prairie, Hooper Branch Savanna, and Loda Cemetery Prairie.

Climate and weather

Adjacent counties
 Kankakee County - north
 Newton County, Indiana - east
 Benton County, Indiana - east
 Vermilion County - south
 Ford County - west

Transportation
Interstate 57 passes through the west part of the county on its route between Champaign and Chicago. From north to south, it passes through or near Chebanse, Clifton, Ashkum, Danforth, Gilman, Onarga, Buckley, and Loda.

The county is bisected by the east–west U.S. Route 24, which passes through Gilman, Crescent City, the county seat of Watseka, and Sheldon.
  Interstate 57
  U.S. Highway 45
  U.S. Highway 52
  Illinois Route 1
  Illinois Route 49
  Illinois Route 54
  Illinois Route 116

Several railroad lines pass through the county. The Toledo, Peoria and Western Railway operates a line that begins in Peoria and runs from east to west through Iroquois County, passing through Gilman and Watseka and continuing into Indiana. A Norfolk Southern Railway line runs nearly parallel with Interstate 57 on its way to Chicago. A CSX Transportation line passes from north to south through the eastern part of the county; a Union Pacific line joins it south of Woodland.  Further east, the Kankakee, Beaverville and Southern Railroad operates a north–south line.

Demographics

As of the 2010 United States Census, there were 29,718 people, 11,956 households, and 8,175 families residing in the county. The racial makeup of the county was 94.7% white, 0.8% black or African American, 0.3% Asian, 0.2% American Indian, 2.6% from other races, and 1.3% from two or more races. Those of Hispanic or Latino origin made up 5.3% of the population. In terms of ancestry, 36.5% were German, 14.1% were Irish, 12.2% were American, and 10.1% were English.

Of the 11,956 households, 30.2% had children under the age of 18 living with them, 54.7% were married couples living together, 9.3% had a female householder with no husband present, 31.6% were non-families, and 27.2% of all households were made up of individuals. The average household size was 2.45 and the average family size was 2.95. The median age was 43.4 years.

The median income for a household in the county was $47,323 and the median income for a family was $56,541. Males had a median income of $43,416 versus $27,908 for females. The per capita income for the county was $23,400. About 8.2% of families and 10.0% of the population were below the poverty line, including 14.1% of those under age 18 and 7.8% of those age 65 or over.

Communities

Cities
 Gilman
 Watseka

Villages

 Ashkum
 Beaverville
 Buckley
 Chebanse
 Cissna Park
 Clifton
 Crescent City
 Danforth
 Donovan
 Iroquois
 Loda
 Martinton
 Milford
 Onarga
 Papineau
 Sheldon
 Stockland
 Thawville
 Wellington
 Woodland

Townships
In 1855, a popular vote resulted in the adoption of township government, which was implemented in 1856.  At that time, eleven townships were created; they are listed below.

 Ash Grove
 Beaver
 Belmont
 Chebanse
 Concord
 Loda
 Middleport
 Milford
 Onarga
 Papineau
 Stockland

Over the next several decades, more townships were created from the existing ones, for a final total of twenty-six.  The newer townships are listed below in order of creation.

 Martinton (1857)
 Iroquois (1858)
 Prairie Green (1858)
 Ashkum (1861)
 Douglas (1861)
 Artesia (1864)
 Fountain Creek (1868)
 Lovejoy (1868)
 Sheldon (1868)
 Milks Grove (1872)
 Pigeon Grove (1876)
 Crescent (1877)
 Danforth (1877)
 Ridgeland (1878)
 Beaverville (1916)

Unincorporated Communities

 Bryce
 Claytonville
 Delrey
 Eastburn
 Effner
 Fountain Creek
 Goodwine
 L'Erable
 La Hogue
 Pittwood
 Stockland

Notable people 

 Fern Andra, movie actress and director from 1913 to 1930, born in Watseka in 1893
 John Moisant, pioneering aviator and aeronautical engineer, born in L'Erable in 1868
 John S. Darrough, recipient of the Medal of Honor, American Civil War, lived in the county from age 14.
 Henry Bacon, architect, born in Wateska in 1866
 Rex Everhart, Broadway actor who voiced the role of Maurice in the Disney Film "Beauty & The Beast," born in Watseka in 1920
 Scott Garrelts, Pitcher, San Francisco Giants, 1st round draft pick in 1979 amateur draft, grew up in Buckley, graduated from Buckley-Loda High School
 Ray A. Laird, president of Laredo Community College in Laredo, Texas, 1960 to 1974; born in Milford in 1907
 Ole Rynning (1809–1838), Norwegian immigrant author
 Fred J. Schraeder (1923-2016), Illinois state representative and businessman, born in Clifton

Politics
Throughout the rest of its history, Iroquois County has been among the most solidly Republican counties in Illinois. Since 1940 only Lyndon Johnson in his 1964 landslide has garnered forty percent of the county’s vote for the Democratic Party, and only Bill Clinton in 1996 has topped 35 percent since 1968.

See also
 National Register of Historic Places listings in Iroquois County, Illinois
 Watseka Wonder, alleged spiritual possession of fourteen-year-old Lurancy Vennum in the late 19th century

References

Bibliography

External links

 Illinois State Archives
 Iroquois County State Wildlife Area

 
Illinois counties
Illinois placenames of Native American origin
1833 establishments in Illinois
Populated places established in 1833